Oureouharé (d. in Quebec, Canada, in 1697) was a Cayuga chief. He was one of the Iroquois chiefs that were seized treacherously and sent to the galleys in France in 1687, after being invited to a conference at Fort Frontenac by Denonville, the Canadian governor. He was allowed to return with Frontenac to Canada in 1689, became attached to the new governor, accompanied him to Montreal, and advised him to release the other Indian captives that were then in Canada. His advice was followed; the Indians were sent back to their tribes, and were exhorted by Oureouhare to persuade the latter to send an embassy to Montreal. This was done on 9 March 1690, and the envoy said that the French prisoners that had been scattered in the other cantons were now all at Onondaga, and would be disposed of as Oureouhare should direct. The efforts of the latter to reconcile the Iroquois to French rule were unsuccessful, and Frontenac began to have doubts of his fidelity. His conduct in 1691, when the Iroquois invaded the French colony, dispelled all doubts, and his bravery at Repentigny contributed greatly to the defeat of the savages. He commanded the Christian Hurons in an engagement at La Prairie in the same year, and afterward pursued a body of Iroquois and recaptured several French prisoners. He then went to Quebec and received the thanks of Frontenac, as well as numerous presents. Several tribes offered to make him their chief, but he replied that he would never leave Ononthio (Frontenac), for whom he seems to have felt a sincere affection. He retired among the Christian Iroquois of the mountain in 1692, but made frequent excursions among the Cayugas and other tribes in the interest of the French, persuading the Cayugas to release their French prisoners, and keeping them firm in their allegiance. He visited Quebec in 1697, and fell sick after his arrival. He was a sincere Christian, and when the missionary who attended him spoke of the crucifixion, it is said that he cried out: "Why was I not there? I would have prevented them from so treating my God." He was buried with pomp. Frontenac regretted him all the more that he relied on him principally for bringing about a treaty with the Iroquois.

References
 

1697 deaths
Native American leaders
Indigenous leaders in Quebec
Cayuga people
Year of birth unknown